JLS: The Theatre Tour is the headlining tour by English boy band JLS. The tour was launched in support of their debut studio album, JLS. The group performed throughout 2010 and early 2011, completing over 70 shows in the United Kingdom. The tour initially began in theatres however as the groups popularity grew, they performed at music festivals and arenas.

The shows at the historic HMV Hammersmith Apollo were filmed and released to home video on 6 December 2010,known as Only Tonight: Live From London.

Opening acts
Phacebook 
Chipmunk 
Alex Gardner 
Diana Vickers 
Beatbullyz 
Six D 
Starboy Nathan 
Stevie Hoang 
Industry 
The Score 
Ruff Diamondz 
Edei

Setlist

Tour dates

Festivals and other miscellaneous performances
Live at the Marquee
The Isle of Man Bay Festival
Haydock Music Nights
Summer Proms Concert
Forestry Commission Live
Sound City Festival
Epsom Live
Ponty's Big Weekend
Sound Island Festival

Box office score data

External links
 JLS Official Website

References

2010 concert tours
2011 concert tours